Afrospilarctia dissimilis is a moth of the family Erebidae. It was described by William Lucas Distant in 1897. It is found in Lesotho and South Africa.

The larvae feed on Vernonia gerrardi.

References

Spilosomina
Moths described in 1897
Moths of Africa